And Then It Got Ugly (2006) is the fourth studio album by American hard rock band Rhino Bucket. The album is their first since 1994's Pain, it features Brian Forsythe of Kix on lead guitar, taking the place of Greg Fields.  The record also marks the return of Jackie Enx (formerly Liam Jason) on drums. The album closes with an acoustic version of the song "I Was Told" from Pain.

Track listing

 "Welcome to Hell"  (4:10) 
 "Dead & Well"   (3:39) 
 "Don't Bring Her Down"  (3:00) 
 "Monkey Boy Highway"   (3:10) 
 "Smile"   (3:32) 
 "Word"   (4:52) 
 "Hammer & Nail"   (3:13) 
 "Invisible"   (3:11) 
 "She Rides"   (4:12) 
 "Blood, Sweat & Beers"   (4:43) 
 "I Was Told"   (3:54)

Personnel
Georg Dolivo: lead vocals, rhythm guitar
Brian "Damage" Forsythe: lead guitar, backing vocals
Reeve Downes: bass guitar, backing vocals
Jackie Enx: drums

References

2006 albums
Rhino Bucket albums